Innerkip Aerodrome  is located  north of Innerkip, Ontario, Canada.

References

Registered aerodromes in Ontario
Transport in Oxford County, Ontario
Buildings and structures in Oxford County, Ontario